The Armed Services Board of Contract Appeals (ASBCA) is an administrative tribunal within the United States Federal Government that hears certain claims arising from contract disputes between government contractors and either the Department of Defense or the National Aeronautics and Space Administration ((e)(1)(a)). The ASBCA was established by statute on May 1, 1962. Its facilities are located in Falls Church, Virginia.

The ASBCA's original jurisdiction over claims involving Government contract disputes partially overlaps as concurrent jurisdiction with the United States Court of Federal Claims under the Contract Disputes Act of 1978, . The United States Court of Appeals for the Federal Circuit may exercise appellate jurisdiction over decisions of the ASBCA involving Government contract disputes ((a)(1)).

See also
 Contract Disputes Act of 1978
 Civilian Board of Contract Appeals
 United States Court of Federal Claims
 United States Court of Appeals for the Federal Circuit

External links
 

Article I tribunals
Government procurement in the United States
1962 establishments in the United States
Courts and tribunals established in 1962